The 2006 Ohio gubernatorial election was held on November 7, 2006, and was a race for the Governor and Lieutenant Governor of Ohio. Incumbent Governor Bob Taft could not run for re-election, because Ohio governors are limited to two consecutive terms in office. The election was held concurrently with a U.S. Senate election. The general election for governor pitted Ohio Secretary of State Ken Blackwell, the Republican nominee, against United States Congressman Ted Strickland of Ohio's 6th congressional district, the Democratic nominee. Their running mates were former Ohio Attorney General Lee Fisher on the Democratic ticket and State Representative Tom Raga on the Republican ticket.

In the end, the contest was not close, and Strickland captured more than 60 percent of the vote, giving him a solid 24-point margin of victory. Strickland was declared the winner right at 7:30 P.M. EST time when the polls closed in Ohio. Blackwell called Strickland and conceded defeat at 8:45 P.M. EST.

Strickland won most areas of the state. In particular, he trounced Blackwell in eastern Ohio, with Blackwell only carrying one county in this region (Holmes). Blackwell did well in the Cincinnati suburbs, although he only narrowly managed to win Hamilton County, which encompasses the City of Cincinnati, by just about 2,000 votes. He did manage to win some rural western counties as well, but Strickland defeated Blackwell in Cuyahoga County and Franklin County, home of Cleveland and Columbus respectively. Strickland also performed strongly in the Rust Belt area from Cleveland all the way to Toledo, as well as in the Akron-Youngstown Area.

This would turn out to be one of the most expensive gubernatorial elections in Ohio's history, and marked the only time since 1986 that a Democrat was elected governor of Ohio. , this was the last time a Democrat was elected Governor of Ohio.

Historical background

National attention
As the election approached, there was increasing national attention on the Ohio gubernatorial election, focused largely on the ability of the Republican party to maintain control in Ohio. Results in Ohio in 2006 were regarded as a possible bellwether for the 2008 presidential election; Ohio was considered a crucial swing state, with 20 electoral votes. Since the Republican Party's inception in 1854, no Republican presidential candidate has ever been elected to office without the electoral votes of Ohio. In contrast, a Democratic candidate has won the national election without the support of Ohio eight times (1836, 1844, 1856, 1884, 1892, 1944, 1960, and 2020). Overall, Ohio's electoral votes have gone to the winner of the election 78% of the time.

Comedian and talk-show host Jon Stewart taped The Daily Show from October 30 to November 2, 2006, at the Roy Bowen Theater on the campus of Ohio State University. The series of episodes was entitled "Battlefield Ohio: The Daily Show's Midwest Midterm Midtacular" and was intended to bring further national attention to the election in Ohio. This was only the second time that the show had been filmed in a location other than New York City.

Ohio, Blackwell, and the 2004 election

Ohio played a decisive role in the 2004 presidential election, as Ohio's electoral votes would have been sufficient to swing the election from George W. Bush to John Kerry had Kerry won in Ohio. Given the importance of the state, Blackwell's role in the conduct of the election was closely scrutinized. As Ohio Secretary of State, Blackwell was the state's chief elections officer. He was also an honorary co-chair for the Bush re-election campaign in Ohio and the most prominent backer of a ballot measure to ban same-sex marriage on the same ballot.

Leading up to the election Blackwell made a number of decisions about the election process, most of which placed additional restrictions on voting. Opponents argued that Blackwell's decisions would have the effect of suppressing turnout among vulnerable populations, most of whom would be expected to vote for Kerry in the presidential contest—and that Blackwell had a conflict of interest as a co-chair of Bush's re-election campaign.  Supporters argued that the Secretary of State had always been a partisan political office and that there was nothing wrong with Blackwell having a preference in the presidential elections; they denied that Blackwell's decisions were designed to benefit Bush.

Reaction to Blackwell's conduct was so strong that a coalition of left-leaning organizations attempted to amend the Ohio Constitution to abolish the Secretary of State's oversight of elections, as part of a package of election reforms.  The proposal was rejected by voters in November 2005.  Dissatisfaction with Blackwell's involvement in the 2004 election apparently hurt him with Ohio's African-American community; according to exit polls, Blackwell received only 20% of the African-American vote in 2006. Exit polls showed that confidence in the election process among Ohio voters was even lower than voters in Florida, the state which produced an unprecedented five-week post-election fight in 2000.  But among voters "very confident" that votes would be counted accurately, Blackwell actually led Strickland.

Republican control
Entering the 2006 campaign, Ohio had been dominated for a decade by Republicans. Republicans had held the governorship for sixteen years, occupied all statewide constitutional offices, and controlled both houses of the state legislature.

Important scandals

Bob Taft

At a low point in his popularity in November 2005, Taft garnered only a 6.5% approval rating. According to polling organization Survey USA, this was a lower proportion than any governor in the United States. A poll taken in May 2006 indicated that only 2% of Ohio residents "strongly approved" of Taft's performance. The low approval ratings led pollster John Zogby to comment, "I'm not aware of anyone who's ever sunk lower."

Taft's low approval ratings follow several years of scandals.  In 2005, Taft pleaded no contest to four ethics violations involving illegal gifts totaling $5,800. He was convicted of four misdemeanors and was ordered to pay a $4,000 fine and apologize to the people of Ohio.  Taft is the only Ohio governor to be convicted of a crime while in office.

Thomas Noe and Coingate

In 1996 the Republican controlled Ohio General Assembly removed a restriction requiring that state investments only be in safer, though lower-yielding, bonds.  After the restriction was eliminated, hundreds of millions of dollars in state funds were invested by a number of investment firms with close ties to the Republican party.  Among those investments was $50 million of the Ohio Bureau of Workers' Compensation fund which was given to Thomas Noe, an investor in rare and unusual coins and major donor to the Republican Party including then-governor Bob Taft.

In 2005 it was revealed that Noe could only account for $13 million of the original investment.  Among the missing funds were two coins worth over $300,000 alone. Throughout 2005, there was a protracted legal battle over the release of records which Noe claimed were privileged and prosecutors claimed were in the public domain.  The Ohio Supreme Court ruled 5-2 in favor of the prosecutors.  On February 13, 2006, Noe was indicted on 53 counts, including: engaging in a pattern of corrupt activity (which carries a mandatory 10-year sentence), 11 counts of theft, 11 counts of money laundering, 8 counts of tampering with records, and 22 counts of forgery. The charges also accuse Noe of personally stealing $2 million. On November 20, 2006, Noe was found guilty of theft, money laundering, forgery and corrupt activity, and was sentenced to serve 18 years in prison, fined $213,000, ordered to pay the $2 million cost of his prosecution and make restitution to the Ohio Bureau of Worker's Compensation.

Also in 2006, Noe pleaded guilty to three charges of using over a dozen people in 2004 as illegal "conduits" to make donations to George W. Bush's re-election campaign of over $45,000 in order to skirt laws limiting donations in federal campaigns to $2,000. Noe was convicted and sentenced to 27 months in federal prison and ordered to pay a $136,000 fine.

Democratic primary

Candidates
Bryan Flannery, former State Representative and nominee for Ohio Secretary of State in 2002
Ted Strickland, U.S. Representative

Campaign
When Strickland first launched his campaign, he was originally also in a tough fight for the nomination, as Columbus Mayor Michael Coleman was also campaigning and raising money. Before attacks were traded between the nominees, Coleman bowed out, citing a need to spend more time with his family.

Results

Republican primary

Candidates
Ken Blackwell, Ohio Secretary of State and nominee for OH-01 in 1990
Jim Petro, Attorney General of Ohio

Campaign
Blackwell and Petro were initially going to be joined in their competitive primary by Ohio State Auditor Betty Montgomery, but Montgomery withdrew from the contest and instead ran for state attorney general, an office she lost. The campaign between the two candidates then heated up; despite commercials preaching his conservative values, Petro was never able to shake his previous pro-choice stance. As the election approached, the barbs grew worse between Petro and Blackwell, only serving to bring more negative attention to the Ohio Republican Party.

Results

General election

Campaign finance

The race for the 2006 election was the most expensive in Ohio's history.  Reflective of both the national significance of the race, as well as the powerful fund-raising capabilities of both parties, Blackwell and Strickland passed the previous fund raising record set in 1998. That record, set when current Governor Bob Taft was running against Lee Fisher (Strickland's running mate), totaled a combined $18 million by the end of the election.  As of September 9, 2006, Blackwell and Strickland had already raised a combined $21.2 million.  Strickland led Blackwell, $11.2 million to $10 million. Most of the money raised in Ohio by both major party candidates came from a single zip code in downtown Columbus, which is home to their respective parties, labor and political groups, lobbyists and lawyers.

A significant amount of money was spent by private groups on behalf of the candidates as well, the estimated combined total at the time of the May 2 primary was $50 million.

Predictions

Polling

Since the first polls on the general election matchup were taken in November 2005, Strickland led Blackwell, though the margin substantially increased in March 2006.

The greatest margin recorded in an individual poll was found in the October 26, 2006, SurveyUSA poll which showed Strickland leading by 30 points.  The smallest recorded margin was the February 6, 2006, Zogby poll showing Strickland leading by a mere 3 points.  When the results are averaged across the different polls, the greatest margin was in October 2006 with a difference of 22.6 points in favor of Strickland.  The smallest average margin was during January 2006 with Strickland leading Blackwell by 4 points.

Results

Results by county

By congressional district
Strickland won 16 of 18 congressional districts, including the 1st, 3rd, 4th, 5th, 7th, 12th, 14th, 15th, and 16th  districts, which elected Republicans to the House.

See also
Coingate scandal

References

External links
Campaign websites (Archived)
Ted Strickland
Ken Blackwell

2006
Gubernatorial
Ohio